CeCe Sammy is a British vocal and performance coach, known for her TV appearances and behind the scenes contributions as a vocal coach, judge, talent scout, advisor and trouble-shooter on various music and entertainment shows such as Pop Idol, S Club Search, The X Factor: Battle of the Stars, Just the Two of Us, Your Face Sounds Familiar Georgia, VH1's Make or Break: The Linda Perry Project, The Voice UK, ITV series Get Your Act Together, Gareth Malone 's BAFTA award-winning TV series The Choir, 'E! Entertainment in the US, American Idol and America's Got Talent. In 2016, she was the chairperson of the British jury for Eurovision Song Contest 2016; the following year CeCe Sammy acted as the judge for the Eurovision: You Decide 2017. In 2017, CeCe Sammy was the Series Head Vocal Coach on BBC One's' Let's Sing and Dance for Comic Relief, worked on the making/selling of the music programme Pitch Battle to the BBC and rounded off the year as Head Vocal Coach on BBC One's new singing show All Together Now. 

CeCe Sammy is also a regular vocal judge for UK singing competitions Open Mic UK and TeenStar UK. CeCe Sammy, a member of the BRIT Awards Voting Academy, is also known for her voluntary work and sits as a board member (Creative Learning and Community Advisor) at the Hackney Empire and works closely with the organisation Education Through Music Los Angeles, and sits on the Board of Governors for a primary school in Islington. CeCe is also a patron of charity The Music Relief Foundation, and supporting the V&A museum by joining the patrons. 

CeCe Sammy now called CeCe Sammy-Lightfoot and is married to Charles Lightfoot.

In 2020 and 2021, CeCe has supported many charities such as Speakers for Schools. https://www.speakersforschools.org/speakers/cece-sammy/

On 30 May 2022, there was a TEDx Soho and CeCe became the Official Voice Coach https://tedxsoho.com/cece

Background
CeCe Sammy is a graduate from the London College of Music, and is a classically trained pianist. She has coached chart acts from the United Kingdom (UK), including Charlotte Church, S Club 7 and S Club Juniors, Will Young and Leona Lewis.

Prior to her coaching career, CeCe Sammy was a backing singer touring with the likes of Diana Ross and Julio Iglesias. She was also a member of the United Colours of Sound with vocal coach partner John Modi and celebrity vocal coaches David and Carrie Grant. She has sung at the Commonwealth Games and Buckingham Palace as well as recording several theme tunes for ITV, Channel 4 and Sky Sports including the official Rugby World Cup song "Swing Low" with UB40, before going on to become a vocal coach to a roster of celebrity clients, such as Sting and One Direction.

She appeared on the television series Pop Idol as a vocal coach and was a judge on the BBC's celebrity duet show Just the Two of Us in 2006 and 2007 along with Stewart Copeland and Tito Jackson.

CeCe Sammy appeared in the BBC TV documentary Be My Baby - The Girl Group Story which aired in August 2006. The show covered the history of girl groups, focusing specifically on The Supremes, The Three Degrees, Sister Sledge, Bananarama, The Bangles and the Spice Girls.

In 2007 she was a judge on BBC Radio 3's Choir of the Year competition. CeCe was one of Bruno Tonioli's panelists on BBC One's DanceX.

CeCe made a guest appearance on ITV's Dancing on Ice in early 2009, where she was seen helping one of the groups that were selected to skate and sing at the same time. She has also appeared as a guest on television and in documentaries, including The Wright Stuff, GMTV, BBC Breakfast, Let Me Entertain You, The Xtra Factor.

In 2010, CeCe Sammy founded an artist development and music management company with legendary artist manager Frank DiLeo. CCA Entertainment operates between London and Los Angeles.

In 2014 and 2015, CeCe Sammy appeared as head vocal coach and judge on the second and third seasons of Endemol's Your Face Sounds Familiar Georgia. She once again reprised the role as vocal judge for a select number of episodes during the fourth season which started in May 2015.

In 2015, CeCe Sammy worked as a vocal coach on the new ITV series Get Your Act Together. She has been a regular talent consultant for American Idol and America's Got Talent. She also was the official vocal coach for 2015 Dubai Music Week.

In 2017, CeCe Sammy worked with manufacturer VTech to launch the Kidi Super Star, a karaoke microphone and stand which reduces the vocals on any song. The system features coaching from CeCe Sammy. 

CeCe Sammy has also recently worked as a vocal coach on films such as the Idris Elba-directed YARDIE and Gurinder Chadha’s Blinded by the Light.

In 2019, BBC launched the "Bring The Noise" campaign and CeCe was a BBC Ambassador and gave her top tips for teaching singing to primary school children and teachers. https://www.bbc.co.uk/teach/bring-the-noise/ce-ce-sammy-teaches-singing/znwj92p

In February 2022, CeCe Sammy-Lightfoot launched and created a short and free Masterclass series online called "Hack Your Voice" to support interviews, during which she shares some of the key lessons she learned as a professional vocal coach and she teaches viewers how to train their voices. https://www.express.co.uk/celebrity-news/1571635/Diana-Ross-CeCe-Sammy-Lightfoot-backing-singer-vocal-coach-news-update-latest
https://www.workingmums.co.uk/top-tips-to-maximise-your-voice/

Personal life 
CeCe Sammy now called CeCe Sammy-Lightfoot and is married to Charles Lightfoot an Eton College and Oxford University alumni, and former university cricket star. Charles Lightfoot is the London Office, managing partner of the international law firm Jenner & Blocks and chair of the firm's International Arbitration Practice. Her husband, Charlie, is incredibly supportive of CeCe's career and has become an invaluable asset to CeCe's growth in balancing her work and family life. Charles consistently shows his devotion and love through his role as a tremendous father to CeCe's biological daughter.

CeCe Lightfoot has two beautiful children, her biological daughter Isabella and the step-son of her husband Charles, Tristan.

The Power Of Muzik 
In 2018, CeCe Sammy launched a new music therapy initiative called ‘The Power of Muzik’, which empowers and inspires young people going through hard times. The Power of Muzik uses music therapy techniques and powerful messaging within their music to educate young people, and have worked with the likes of Vanessa Feltz, Ben Ofoedu, Diana Vickers, Mo Jamil and more. 

As part of the initiative, CeCe Sammy formed a collective of singers who have performed at top UK music events throughout 2018. These performances have included the national UK STEPS tour, Brighton Pride, Fusion Festival and more. 

The collective of singers, as well as CeCe Sammy and ambassadors for The Power Of Muzik, have travelled across the UK performing directly to students in their schools. Over 20,000 children have seen and heard the positive message being spread by the initiative, with more performances confirmed for the future. 

CeCe's released a debut book called "If You Can Speak You Can Sing" was released in February 2019. Publisher was Eyewear publishing and is sold online but also on WH Smith, Waterstones, and Amazon. CeCe Sammy has also given free books to many state schools across the country for use in their library as CeCe wanted the children to have the same opportunity of self help.https://store.eyewearpublishing.com/products/if-you-can-speak-you-can-sing 

LOCKDOWN: CeCe gave free singing and breathing workshops during the stressful weeks of lockdown to people https://www.hamhigh.co.uk/etcetera/music/hampstead-vocal-coach-cece-sammy-gives-free-breathing-and-voice-coaching-1-6640786

References

External links
official website

British vocal coaches
Living people
1977 births